The Kirby-Hill House, at 210 Main St. in Kountze, Texas, was built in 1902.  It was listed on the National Register of Historic Places in 1999.  It is also a Recorded Texas Historic Landmark.

It is a Queen Anne-style house with Colonial Revival details.

Its most prominent feature is its two-story wraparound porch, which has 
22 Tuscan columns on each level.

References

National Register of Historic Places in Hardin County, Texas
Queen Anne architecture in Texas
Colonial Revival architecture in Texas
Houses completed in 1902